Ahmed Hifzi Pasha (1832 – 1900) was an Ottoman Albanian field marshal, who was the Commander-in-Chief of the Ottoman Army that defeated the Greeks on the Epirus front in the Greco-Turkish War (1897). He was also the commander in the Battle of Gorni Dubnik in October 1877, the governor of Kosovo between June 1881 and July 1898, and the governor of Ioannina between October 1889 and October 1897.

1832 births
1900 deaths
Ottoman Army generals
Pashas
Governors of the Ottoman Empire
Ottoman military personnel of the Russo-Turkish War (1877–1878)
Ottoman military personnel of the Greco-Turkish War (1897)